Janani is an 2022 Indian-Kannada language family drama which premiered on Udaya TV on 15 August 2022 starring Varshika, Shwetha, Roopa and Shilpa Iyer in lead roles.  The show is an official remake of Tamil serial Ethirneechal.

Cast

Main

Supporting

Production
The serial marks the debut of actor Chi. Guru Dutt as a producer for the first time.

Adaptations

References

2022 Indian television series debuts
Udaya TV original programming
Kannada-language television shows
Kannada-language television series based on Tamil-language television series